Bodhi is a Buddhist term associated with enlightenment.

Bodhi may also refer to:

People 
 Bodhi Elfman, American actor
 Bhikkhu Bodhi (born 1944), American Buddhist monk
 Sinn Bodhi (born 1973), Serbo-Canadian professional wrestler

Other uses 
 Bodhi Linux, a Linux distribution
 Bodhi Magazine, a Buddhist periodical
 Bodhi Tree, under which Siddhartha Gautama attained enlightenment.
 Ficus religiosa, a species of fig tree
 Bodhi Rook, a character in the Star Wars franchise
 Bodhi (character), a fictional character in the 1991 film Point Break and its 2015 remake
 Bodhi (vampire), a fictional character in the 2000 video game Baldur's Gate II: Shadows of Amn